The Vicious Circle is a 1957 British thriller film directed by Gerald Thomas and starring John Mills, Noelle Middleton, Wilfrid Hyde-White and Lionel Jeffries. The screenplay concerns a leading Harley Street specialist who is forced to work with the police to nail a gang of international criminals, after being falsely accused of murder. It was based on My Friend Charles (1956), a TV serial written by Francis Durbridge.

Plot
Doctor Howard Latimer answers what he believes to be a request for a favour from an American friend by picking up a famous German actress from London Airport. He goes in the company of a journalist Geoffrey Windsor who tags along after failing to gain an interview with Latimer about recent medical research. As Latimer is already late for a date with his fiancée at the Royal Festival Hall, he lets Windsor take the actress to Claridges Hotel.

When her body is later discovered in Latimer's flat, with absolutely no trace of Windsor, he is faced with questions from the police. DI Dane is initially sympathetic but as the evidence mounts up it increasingly seems as if only Latimer could have committed the murder. Latimer has the added problem of Mrs Ambler, a patient referred to him by his colleague Doctor Kimber, who keeps changing her suspicious story. With the evidence looking as though he will be charged, he goes to stay at his friend Kenneth Palmer's house where he hopes to avoid the police. While there he encounters the mysterious "Robert Brady" who shows a strange interest in a matchbook given to Latimer by the German actress.

When Mrs Ambler's dead body is found suspicion again points towards Latimer. However DI Dane appears to believe in his innocence. When Latimer is approached by Windsor demanding £4,000 in blackmail - not from Latimer but from Doctor Kimber - the police reveal that they know more about the case than they had been letting on. Latimer is introduced to the man he believed to be Brady who is in fact Major Harrington who works in Intelligence. Harrington reveals that the case revolves around a passport-forging ring led by an Englishman at its head. Latimer then works with the police to help unmask the criminal amongst his acquaintances.

Cast
 John Mills - Doctor Howard Latimer
 Derek Farr - Kenneth Palmer
 Noelle Middleton - Laura James
 Wilfrid Hyde-White - Major Harrington/Robert Brady
 Roland Culver - Detective Inspector Dane
 Mervyn Johns - Doctor George Kimber
 Rene Ray - Mrs Ambler
 Lionel Jeffries - Geoffrey Windsor
 Lisa Daniely - Frieda Veldon
 David Williams - Detective Sergeant
 Diana Lambert - Latimer's Office Nurse
 Hal Osmond - Joe, the golf caddy

Critical reception
 In The New York Times, Bosley Crowther thought the film was "of not too high an order in the mystery melodrama line. Francis Durbridge's fiction, which has a forgery ring at its core, is considerably farfetched and frenzied, not to mention cluttered and confused...Actually, the actors in it are some of Britain's best, from Mr. Mills and Mr. Culver to Wilfrid Hyde White and Mervyn Johns."
 A reviewer for Sky Movies wrote that the film has "one of the most tortuous plots ever devised...The suspense mounts steadily under master thriller writer Francis Durbridge's guiding hand, and most English critics were won over by the results. An excellent cast will keep you guessing throughout."

References

External links
 

1957 films
British crime thriller films
1950s crime thriller films
1950s English-language films
Films directed by Gerald Thomas
Films produced by Peter Rogers
1950s British films
Films based on television series